"The Wacky Molestation Adventure" is the sixteenth and penultimate episode of the fourth season of the animated television series South Park, and the 64th episode of the series overall. Written and directed by series co-creator Trey Parker, it originally aired in the United States on December 13, 2000 on Comedy Central. In the episode, the children of South Park remove all adults from the town by claiming that they molested them. With the town to themselves, they create a new society, but it quickly deteriorates and separate groups are formed. Much of the episode's plot is inspired by the 1984 film Children of the Corn, based on the Stephen King short story, as well as “Miri,” an episode of Star Trek: The Original Series. The 1976 film Logan's Run is also an influence.

In the summer of 2013, fans voted "The Wacky Molestation Adventure" as the best episode of Season 4.

Plot
Cartman has four tickets to the "Raging Pussies" concert and the boys all want to go. When Kyle asks his parents for permission, they characteristically prohibit him from going. After relentless negotiation, Kyle's mom sarcastically agrees that Kyle can go if he cleans out the garage, shovels all the snow from the driveway and brings democracy to Cuba - all of which Kyle manages to achieve, the third by writing a heartfelt letter to Fidel Castro (similar to a musical number from The Year Without a Santa Claus). It is later announced on the news that Kyle has brought democracy to Cuba and American tourists are now allowed in. Despite his success, his parents still refuse to let him go. In his fury, he questions his parents' authority of his safety and angrily wishes that he had no parents at all.

When Kyle shares his frustration with his friends, Cartman suggests that he call the police and tell them that his parents have been "molestering"  him, which will make them go away (a trick he played on his mother's ex-boyfriend). After some practice to get the accusation right, Kyle makes the call and the police arrest his parents, despite Sheila's tearful pleas that neither she nor Gerald did such a thing as they are taken away. The boys then go to the concert and Kyle later hosts a party at his parent-free home and dances in his white underwear to the song "Old Time Rock and Roll" (a reference to a classic scene in Risky Business). Seeing how liberated they are without parents, all of the children begin calling the police on their parents and teachers resulting in the adults being taken to prison. Even Shelley, Stan's sister, is arrested after she is about to attack Stan as he celebrates their parents' arrest (though it is never shown what happens to her while the adults are in jail). Soon, nearly all of the town's adults have been arrested, the rest having moved away over fears of being arrested and only the children populate the town. With the adults gone and the town in the children's control, Stan declares, "It's ours."

Sometime later, a couple from out of town, Mark and Linda Cotner, are having car trouble as they approach the limits of "Smiley Town" (the South Park sign has been overwritten with "Smiley Town"). They make it to a garage where they meet Butters and Craig. They ask for the nearest phone and are told that it is in "Treasure Cove". They also discover that South Park has been divided into "Smiley Town" and "Treasure Cove" by a long white line.  Mark and Linda attempt to enter "Treasure Cove" but are attacked by kindergarteners and driven back into Smiley Town. Craig and others come to their rescue and take them to meet the mayor of "Smiley Town" a.k.a. Cartman. Knowing that a ritual called "Carousel" is going to be held that night, Cartman asks Mark and Linda to go to Treasure Cove and retrieve a book for him. Getting the book will force a member of Treasure Cove to be sacrificed to "The Provider": a statue of John Elway with bodies next to it (Kenny is seen as one of the sacrifices). Mark and Linda agree to help, find the book, are attacked by residents of Treasure Cove, and taken back to the elementary school where Stan and Kyle are in charge.

Stan asks why Mark and Linda are helping Cartman and offers to get them to the nearest phone if Mark and Linda agrees to help them instead. He then tells them the story of "the before time in the long, long ago", which includes the reasons for the existence of Smiley Town, Treasure Cove, "Carousel", "The Provider", and "The M Word". Mark and Linda then agree to get the book from Smiley Town.  Meanwhile, their parents are in prison working out their "sick sexual urges" with a counselor who helps them identify alternative activities to molesting their children.

Back in South Park, Mark gets Cartman's book for Stan and Mayor Cartman chooses Butters to be sacrificed. Realizing the danger to Butters, Mark and Linda attempt to interfere with the ceremony. In response, Cartman threatens to call the police and claim that the couple "molestered" the children. Mark realizes that the town has descended into anarchy because the parents were all falsely accused of molesting the children. He explains to the kids in a speech that their parents, the "birth givers", are their providers. The word "parents" resonates with the children and causes them to remember. Stan then reveals that it has only been ten days since the town's parents and adults left, much to Mark and Linda's surprise. The children allow Mark to make his important phone call and to also call the police, clearing their parents of all wrongdoing. Mark tells Linda that maybe they should have children, but after all they have been through, she decides to get her tubes tied.

As the children await the return of their parents, Mark and Linda drive up and announce that Linda got her tubes tied, and reveal that Mark got the job that his "important call" was for: the manager of a Denny's restaurant in Breckenridge. When the parents arrive, they now believe they are "cured" of the "sick sexual urges" that they never had (after they've been conditioned to believe they actually had molested their kids). The parents are reunited with their children, the latter who are confused by their parents' actions. Ultimately, and to Mark and Linda's surprise, the boys decide to immediately make snow igloos (indicating that they do not care about their parents' traumatic ordeal since the problem had seemed to resolve itself and as if the events of the past ten days never happened).

References

External links

 "The Wacky Molestation Adventure" Full episode at South Park Studios
 

South Park (season 4) episodes
Television episodes set in Cuba
Cultural depictions of Fidel Castro